You Might As Well Live is a 2009 Canadian comedy film directed by Simon Ennis. The film stars Joshua Peace as Robert Mutt, an unsuccessful slacker who has just been released from the hospital following a suicide attempt and is on a quest to transform his life after experiencing a vision of baseball legend Clinton Manitoba telling him that the three keys to success in life are to "get money, a girlfriend and a championship ring." The film’s title comes from the poem "Resumé", by Dorothy Parker.

Cast

Release

Critical reception 

On review aggregation website Rotten Tomatoes, the film holds an approval rating of 67% based on 6 reviews, and an average rating of 5.5/10.

Variety's Dennis Harvey gave the film a mostly positive review, remarking that the film was "a promising first-feature collaboration for director Simon Ennis and co-writer/star Joshua Peace", and noted that "[w]hile it's seldom uproarious, there's steady amusement". Katherine Monk of the Edmonton Journal called the film an "overlong comedy sketch", but opined that it was redeemed by strong acting.

Accolades 
The film's make-up team, Robbi O'Quinn and Leanne Morrison, received a Genie Award nomination for Best Makeup at the 30th Genie Awards.

References

External links 
 
 

2009 films
English-language Canadian films
Canadian comedy-drama films
2009 comedy-drama films
Films shot in Hamilton, Ontario
Films shot in Toronto
2000s English-language films
2000s Canadian films